A Man Astray (German: Ein Mann auf Abwegen) is a 1940 German comedy adventure film directed by Herbert Selpin and starring Hans Albers, Charlotte Thiele and Hilde Weissner. The film is an adaptation of the 1938 novel Percy auf Abwegen by Hans Zehrer. It was shot at the Halensee Studios in Berlin and the Bavaria Studios in Munich. Location shooting took place around Lake Starnberg in Bavaria. The film's sets were designed by the art directors Paul Markwitz and Fritz Maurischat. A financial success, it was produced and distributed by Tobis Film, one of Nazi Germany's leading film companies.

Synopsis
Percival Pattersson, a wealthy Swedish industrialist disappears one morning without warning, and police suspect a crime. However his daughter Ingrid and a journalist both suspect he has deliberately vanished and set out to track him down. Pattersson has in fact been laying low incognito but when his daughter approaches, he flees to Geneva posing as the chauffeur of the singer Lisaweta who he has fallen in love with.

Cast
 Hans Albers as Percival Pattersson
 Charlotte Thiele as Ingrid Pattersson
 Hilde Weissner as Lisaweta Iwanowna
 Gustav Waldau as Raymondo Duvallo
 Hilde Sessak as Marcella Duvallo
 Werner Fuetterer as 	Nils Nilsen
 Peter Voß as 	Sully
 Herbert Hübner as 	Meyers
 Werner Scharf as 	Strakosch, Lisawetas Sekretär
 Gerhard Dammann as 	Der Wirt in der Taverne
 Charly Berger as 	Ein Direktionsmitglieder des Patterson-Konzerns
 Fritz Draeger as Ein Tänzer in der Bar
 Angelo Ferrari as 	Der italienische Chauffeur
 Harry Hardt as Empfangschef im Kasino-Restaurant
 Fritz Hinz-Fabricius as 	Archibald, Patterssons Diener
 Heinz Förster-Ludwig as 	Der Chauffeur bei Percy Pattersson
 Christa Dilthey	as	Die Sekretärin Nils Nilsens
 Alfred Karen as 	Ein Direktionsmitglied des Patterson-Konzerns
 	Karl Junge-Swinburne as 	Der Schneidermeister der Chauffeuruniform
 Egon Stief as Ein Gast am Eingang der Taverne
 Theodor Thony as 	Ein Völkerbundabgeordneter
 Gustl Kreusch as 	Renée, Köchin
 Arthur Reinhardt as 	Ein Polizist
 Manfred Meurer	as	Der geohrfeigte Mitarbeiter Nils Nilsens
 Werner Schott as 	Carlsson, Patterssons Sekretär
 Friedrich Ulmer as 	Der Kommissar
 Aruth Wartan as Manula, der Chefkoch im Kasinorestaurant

References

Bibliography 
 Giesen, Rolf. The Nosferatu Story: The Seminal Horror Film, Its Predecessors and Its Enduring Legacy. McFarland, 2019.
Hull, David Stewart. Film in the Third Reich: Art and Propaganda in Nazi Germany, Simon & Schuster, 1973.
 Rentschler, Eric. The Ministry of Illusion: Nazi Cinema and Its Afterlife. Harvard University Press, 1996.

External links 
 

1940 films
Films of Nazi Germany
German adventure films
1940s adventure films
1940s German-language films
Films directed by Herbert Selpin
Tobis Film films
1940s German films
Films based on German novels
Films shot at Halensee Studios
Films shot at Bavaria Studios
Films shot in Bavaria
Films set in Geneva